Rabbit's Kin is a 1952 Warner Bros. Merrie Melodies animated short directed by Robert McKimson and written by Tedd Pierce. The cartoon was released on November 15, 1952, and stars Bugs Bunny. The cartoon was animated by Charles McKimson, Herman Cohen, Rod Scribner, Phil DeLara and Keith Darling. The music was scored by Carl Stalling while the layouts and backgrounds were done by Robert Givens and Richard H. Thomas, respectively.

Mel Blanc performs the voice of Bugs Bunny and Shorty Rabbit, while Stan Freberg voiced Bugs' new enemy Pete Puma, doing an imitation of the character Frank Fontaine introduced on The Jack Benny Show named John L. C. Silvoney, and later performed on The Jackie Gleason Show as Crazy Guggenheim. The title is a play on "rabbit skin", but is also a literal term in that Bugs is caring for a "kin", here, another rabbit. Blanc used a slightly higher register of Sylvester the Cat for the voice of Shorty, before it was sped up.

Plot
A rabbit named Shorty with a fast high pitched voice is running from a cougar named Pete Puma, until he stumbles down Bugs Bunny's rabbit hole. Shorty tells Bugs his problem ("My heart pounded, my legs trembled, I was frozen with fear"), and Bugs agrees to help him out. Bugs then proceeds to play various tricks on Pete who is now outside of Bugs' hole feeling around inside for the little rabbit.  Bugs leaves a fake rabbit dynamite decoy which Pete grabs and pulls out of the hole, then BOOM!   Bugs goes outside and engages in some small talk with Pete who offers him a cigar ("El Explodo").  After Bugs accepts it (and wisely puts it away before Pete can light it), he asks Pete to stay for tea.  He pours tea into two cups, holds up the sugar bowl and asks Pete how many lumps he wants, to which Pete replies "Oh, three or four".  Bugs repeatedly hits Pete Puma on the head with a wooden mallet, producing five lumps on his head which is "one too many".  Bugs flattens the extra lump with a reflex hammer, then shoves the explosive cigar into Pete's mouth, lights it and runs off before the explosion.

Later that day, Pete tries to disguise himself as the little rabbit's mother, prompting Bugs to start the "cup of tea" trick again. "But I don't want no TEA!", Pete insists. "It gives me a headache!" Here, Pete tries to outsmart Bugs twice but fails both times, by first suggesting they have coffee instead of tea (the "lumps" gag is predictably repeated), then by showing Bugs he has protected his head with an "Acme Stovelid"; Bugs removes it with his "Acme Stovelid Lifter", revealing the lumps on Pete's head.

Shorty enjoys the shenanigans so much that he wants to get involved.  As he hops down the road alone, Pete grabs him and runs home to his cave, intending to cook him. Bugs shows up in a costume disguised as Pete's second cousin, Paul Puma.  He insists on helping his "cuz" get the fricasseeing off to a good start and asks how many lumps of coal Pete wants for the stove.  After Pete decides that he needs a lot of lumps ("A whoooooooole lotta lumps"), he gets "wise" right away, grabs the mallet from Bugs and insists: "I'll help myself".  As Pete repeatedly conks himself over the head with the mallet, Bugs & Shorty sneak out of the cave.  As they leave, Bugs comments that "he's much too smart for us" and imitates Pete's laugh.

Home media
Rabbit's Kin is available on the Looney Tunes Golden Collection: Volume 1.

References

External links
 Rabbit's Kin at Internet Movie Database
 Entry at dcbd.com

1952 films
1952 animated films
1952 short films
Merrie Melodies short films
Films directed by Robert McKimson
Films scored by Carl Stalling
Animated films about rabbits and hares
Animated films about cats
Bugs Bunny films
1950s Warner Bros. animated short films
1950s English-language films
Films about cougars